Farlaine the Goblin is an anonymous American comic book series. The series is notable for being published in a horizontal format(11" x 7 1/8").

The series is 7 volumes long, each volume varying in length between 30-50 pages and telling the story of Farlaine's adventures in a single land.

Main story

Farlaine the Goblin is a tree goblin shaman on a quest to find a forest of his own. He has spent years wandering the Oddlands Of Wug in search of a forest and is down to the final 10 lands left to explore.

Each book in the series explores one of these final lands.

References

American comics